The Spanish International Amateur Championship (Copa S.M. el Rey) is an annual amateur golf tournament in Spain for men.

Prior to 2020 it was an "A" rated tournament in the World Amateur Golf Ranking. (The calculation of the ranking changed in 2020 and there were no longer any categories.) The tournament has been appointed as a qualifying event for boys for the European teams in the Junior Ryder Cup and the Junior Solheim Cup.

The tournament begins with 36 holes of stroke play, were the best placed players qualify for a following match play competition. In 2020, the 32 best players qualified for the match-play.

Every year the tournament has taken place, except 1914, 1949 and 1955, the Spanish International Ladies Amateur Championship has also been played. Until 1985, it was on the same course as the men's tournament.

Winners 

Source:

References

External links 
 Royal Spanish Golf Federation

Golf tournaments in Spain
Amateur golf tournaments
Annual sporting events in Spain
Men's sports competitions in Spain